Yuan Aijun (born April 7, 1977 in Taizhou, Jiangsu) is a male Chinese weightlifter who competed in the 2004 Summer Olympics.

In 2004 he finished fifth in the 85 kg class.

References
 profile

1977 births
Living people
Olympic weightlifters of China
People from Taizhou, Jiangsu
Weightlifters at the 2004 Summer Olympics
Asian Games medalists in weightlifting
Weightlifters from Jiangsu
Weightlifters at the 1998 Asian Games
Weightlifters at the 2002 Asian Games
Chinese male weightlifters

Asian Games silver medalists for China
Medalists at the 1998 Asian Games
20th-century Chinese people
21st-century Chinese people